Linford may refer to:

Places:
Linford, Essex, a location in England
Linford, Hampshire, England
Great Linford, historic village in the northern part of Milton Keynes, England
Little Linford, village in the Borough of Milton Keynes, England
Newtown Linford, linear village in Leicestershire, England

Given name:
Linford Christie OBE (born 1960), former athlete who specialised in the 100 metres
Herbert Linford Gwyer, the second Bishop of George, and a survivor of the sinking of the Lusitania
 Linford Carey, Professor of Speech and Theatre in New York City

Surname:
Colin Linford, president of the Canadian Soccer Association until August 2007
John Linford (born 1957), retired English footballer
Lewis Linford (born 1987), British actor
Steve Linford, British anti-spam campaigner, founder of The Spamhaus Project

Other:
Linford Group, construction company in the United Kingdom which specializes in the restoration of historic buildings
Linford Manor, old mansion or manor house converted into a recording studio complex in Great Linford